The Gasoline Age is an album by East River Pipe, released in 1999.

Critical reception
The A.V. Club wrote that "the synthy, slightly samey pleasures of The Gasoline Age aren't quite as compelling as Cornog's earlier works—in fitting with the car theme, some of it sounds like it was composed on cruise control—but East River Pipe still has a way with moody, mellow mini-epics that puts other sad sacks to shame."

Track listing
"Shiny, Shiny Pimpmobile" – 3:40
"Hell Is an Open Door" – 2:39
"Cybercar" – 3:13
"Wholesale Lies" – 1:44
"My Little Rainbow" – 2:14
"Party Drive" – 3:31
"King of Nothing Never" – 1:57
"14th Street Boys Stolen Car Club" – 2:19
"All You Little Suckers" – 2:07
"Astrofarm" – 4:30
"Down 42nd Street to the Light" – 4:04
"Atlantic City (Gonna Make a Million Tonight)" – 9:43
"Don't Hurry" – 2:56

References

1999 albums
East River Pipe albums